Ludovic Dubau (born 17 November 1973) is a French cyclist. He competed in the men's cross-country mountain biking event at the 2000 Summer Olympics.

References

External links
 

1973 births
Living people
French male cyclists
Olympic cyclists of France
Cyclists at the 2000 Summer Olympics
Sportspeople from Reims
Cyclists from Grand Est